Lauterstein is a municipality of the district of Göppingen in Baden-Württemberg, Germany.

History
The municipality of Lauterstein was formed on 1 January 1974 by the merging of the municipalities of Nenningen and Weißenstein.

Geography
The municipality (Gemeinde) of Lauterstein is found in the district of Göppingen, in Baden-Württemberg, one of the 16 States of the Federal Republic of Germany. Lauterstein lies on the northeast edge of Göppingen's district, along its border with the Ostalb district. Elevation above sea level in the municipal area ranges from a high of  Normalnull (NN) to a low of  NN.

Portions of the Federally-protected  and  nature reserves are located in Lauterstein's municipal area.

Politics
Lauterstein has two boroughs (Ortsteile), Nenningen and Weißenstein, and six villages: Albhof, Birkenbuckelweg, Christentalhof, Edelmannshof, Lützelalb, Ruppertsstetten, and Steighof. The abandoned village of Buitingen is also located in the municipal area.

Coat of arms
The municipal coat of arms for Lauterstein displays a white obelisk flanked to the left by a lion, in red and facing to the right, and a green, winged  to the right. This pattern combines components of three other coats of arms; the lion is taken from the Lords of Rechberg and previously appeared on the coat of arms of Nenningen, as did the winged eagle foot. The obelisk is a holdover from Weißenstein's coat of arms. Lauterstein's coat of arms was awarded and a corresponding municipal flag issued by the Göppingen district office on 26 September 1978.

Transportation

References

External links

  (in German)

Towns in Baden-Württemberg
Göppingen (district)